Nguyễn Thị Duệ (阮氏叡, 1574 – 1654) courtesy name Ngọc Toàn (玉全), pen name Diệu Huyền (妙玄), Đào Hoa Am (桃花庵), was a Vietnamese Imperial consort and scholar, referred to as the first female doctor of Việt Nam.

Biography
She was born in 1574 at Kiệt Đặc village, Bằng Châu, Dương Kinh. As a child, she was known as an intelligent and beautiful girl. However, Nguyễn Thị Duệ was only interested in her studies.

In 1592, the capital Đông Kinh was captured by the Trịnh army and then recaptured a year later. The Mạc had lost all of Việt Nam except for the areas around Cao Bình county, which were under the formal protection of the Ming army. The new Mạc leader Mạc Kính Chỉ and his son Mạc Kính Cung were proclaimed as Vietnamese emperors.

In this time, Nguyễn Thị Duệ's family fled to Cao Bình to live with the Mạc lords . In 1594, disguised as a man to take the Civil Service Exams under the pseudonym Nguyễn Thị Du (阮氏瑜), she passed the exam and achieved the rank of doctor. However, her gender was discovered by emperor Mạc Đại Tông at the imperial party. The emperor only complimented her and asked her to teach his wives. Some months later, she also became the consort Nội-thị cung-tần (內侍宮嬪) by hereditary title Star Consort (星飛).

When Mạc's enemies annihilated the dynasty, Nguyễn Thị Duệ was taken captive. Instead of executing her, the invaders installed her as an imperial tutor out of admiration for her intellect. At the court of emperor Lê Thần Tông, she became the consort Chiêu-nghi (昭儀) by order of a new hereditary title Officer Nghi-ái (儀愛官).

References

1574 births
1654 deaths
People from Hải Dương province
Vietnamese Confucianists
Vietnamese women poets
Vietnamese writers
Lê dynasty officials
Mạc dynasty
Deified Vietnamese people
16th-century Vietnamese women
16th-century women writers
17th-century Vietnamese women
17th-century women writers
16th-century educators
17th-century educators